Gibson Lake is an endorheic lake in the municipality of South Frontenac, Frontenac County in Eastern Ontario, Canada. It lies within Frontenac Provincial Park.

See also
List of lakes in Ontario

References

Other map sources:

Lakes of Frontenac County